Rwesero Art Museum is a museum in Nyanza, Rwanda. It is under the responsibility of the  Institute of National Museums of Rwanda.

It was built as a palace for King Mutara III Rudahigwa, but he never had time to move into it; he died before occupying it, and was turned into an art museum.

References

Museums in Rwanda